Joanne Osborne is an American politician and a former Republican member of the Arizona House of Representatives representing District 13 from 2019 to 2023. Osborne was elected in 2018 defeating Republican incumbent State Representative Darin Mitchell in the Republican primary.

Osborne is a native of Goodyear, Arizona, and served on the Goodyear City Council for 10 years, in addition to serving as the Vice Mayor of Goodyear from 2011 to 2013. She was also a member of the Goodyear Planning & Zoning Commission.

References

Year of birth missing (living people)
Living people
Republican Party members of the Arizona House of Representatives
21st-century American politicians
21st-century American women politicians
Arizona city council members
Women city councillors in Arizona
Women state legislators in Arizona
People from Maricopa County, Arizona